Edwin Maurice "Eddie" Purkiss (27 July 1934 – 15 January 2008) was a rugby union player who represented Australia.

Purkiss, a flanker, was born in Grafton, New South Wales, and claimed a total of 2 international rugby caps for Australia. He made the Wallabies' 1957–58 Australia rugby union tour of Britain, Ireland and France.

References

Australian rugby union players
Australia international rugby union players
1934 births
2008 deaths
Rugby union flankers
Rugby union players from New South Wales